The Rathbones Folio Prize, previously known as the Folio Prize and The Literature Prize, is a literary award that was sponsored by the London-based publisher The Folio Society for its first two years, 2014–2015. Starting in 2017 the sponsor is Rathbone Investment Management.

Folio Prize

The prize came into being after a group in Britain "took umbrage at the direction they saw the Booker Prize taking – they saw it leaning toward popular fiction rather than literary fiction." It was described as "complementary to other awards" and "Booker without the bow ties". Margaret Atwood said the Folio Prize is "much needed in a world in which money is increasingly becoming the measure of all things." Mark Haddon said it was "not a mechanism for generating publicity by propelling a single book into the spotlight but a celebration of literary fiction as a whole." The co-founders are Andrew Kidd and Kate Harvey.

The Folio Prize during the first two years was presented to an English-language book of fiction published in the UK by an author from any country. Prior to its launch it was called the "Literature Prize" as a placeholder until a sponsor was found; then renamed the Folio Prize in 2014, for the Folio Society, a publisher of special editions of classic literature. The prize remuneration in the first two years was £40,000. For 2017 and 2018 the prize amount was £20,000 and starting in 2019 it was increased to £30,000.

Beginning with the 2017 Rathbones sponsorship, the prize was awarded to the best new work of literature published in the English language during a given year, regardless of form (fiction, non-fiction and poetry). The Rathbones sponsorship supports a number of initiatives generated out of The Folio Academy, the group of writers who form the Prize's de facto governing body. Initiatives include a new Academy mentorship scheme, in association with the charity First Story, which will mentor aspiring young writers, as well as a series of Rathbones Folio Sessions throughout the year in the form of literary workshops, lectures and debates.

The jury for the prize is called the Academy, a body of more than 250 writers and critics that includes Margaret Atwood, Peter Carey, A. S. Byatt, Zadie Smith and J. M. Coetzee. Books are nominated by members of the Academy, three each, ranked. Points are given to each book depending on how many first, second or third rankings are earned. The top scoring books are made into a longlist of 60 books (80 in the first two years), and the judges can "call in" another 20 books from their publishers. The list of 80 nominated titles is then judged by a panel of three to five judges drawn from the Academy who select a shortlist (of eight titles, up to 2022) and the final winner.

In 2023 three shortlists of five titles each  were introduced, in the genres of fiction, non-fiction and poetry, although the prize constitution and website state that the shortlists will contain four titles. Each genre winner will receive a prize of £2,000 and the genre winners will be judged for the overall Folio Prize.

Recipients

References

External links
Rathbones Folio Prize, official website
The Folio Prize at The Folio Society

English literary awards
British fiction awards
Awards established in 2014
2014 establishments in England
English-language literary awards